Almida Winquist de Val (born 12 September 1997) is a Swedish curler from Sundbyberg. She currently plays third and is vice skip on Team Isabella Wranå, also known as Team Panthera. With this team, she won a gold medal at the 2017 World Junior Curling Championships. de Val has studied engineering at the Swedish Institute of Technology (KTH) in Stockholm, where she received her Master's degree in 2021.

Career
de Val played in the World Junior Curling Championships in 2014, 2017 and 2018 as a member of Team Isabella Wranå. In 2014, her team of Isabella Wranå, Jennie Wåhlin, Elin Lövstrand, and Fanny Sjöberg had a fourth-place finish after they lost in the bronze medal game to Russia. de Val was the alternate on the team but played no games. She was back at the event in 2017 as the official second of the team, replacing Lövstrand. The team made it all the way to the final and defeated Scotland's Sophie Jackson to win the gold medal, and lost just two round robin games in the process. The same team went undefeated the next year in the round robin but ended up losing to Canada's Kaitlyn Jones in the final. This team also represented Sweden at the 2017 Winter Universiade, where they took home the bronze medal and again in 2019, winning the gold medal. de Val represented Sweden one more time at the juniors in 2019 as the fourth for Tova Sundberg, who threw third stones. They placed sixth.

As World Junior champions, the Wranå team qualified for the 2017 Humpty's Champions Cup, de Val's first Grand Slam event. The team did not qualify for the playoffs but did win one game. The team won their first World Curling Tour event at the 2018 AMJ Campbell Shorty Jenkins Classic. A month later, they won the Paf Masters Tour. Throughout the 2018–19 season, the team played in four slams, failing to qualify in any of the four. They won one game at the 2018 Tour Challenge, one game at the 2018 National, no games at the 2019 Canadian Open, and one game at the 2019 Champions Cup. Also during this season, the team won the 2019 Winter Universiade.

Team Wranå had a successful 2019–20 season, winning two tour events (the Royal LePage Women's Fall Classic and the Paf Masters Tour once again) and finishing second at the Women's Masters Basel and the Glynhill Ladies International. They played in two slam events, winning one game at both the 2019 Tour Challenge and the 2019 National.

Due to the COVID-19 pandemic, Team Wranå only played in one tour event during the abbreviated 2020–21 season. The team competed at the 2020 Women's Masters Basel, where they missed the playoffs with a 1–2 record. In December, they played Team Hasselborg in the Sweden National Challenge, where they won by a score of 17–12. The Swedish Women's Curling Championship was cancelled due to the pandemic, so Team Hasselborg was named as the Swedish Team for the 2021 World Women's Curling Championship. After the season, longtime lead Fanny Sjöberg stepped back from competitive curling and Maria Larsson joined the team as their new lead.

In their first event of the 2021–22 season, Team Wranå reached the final of the 2021 Euro Super Series where they lost to Rebecca Morrison. They also reached the semifinals of the 2021 Women's Masters Basel before being eliminated by Denmark's Madeleine Dupont. After missing the playoffs at the 2021 Masters, Team Wranå made the playoffs at a Grand Slam event for the first time at the 2021 National before being eliminated in the quarterfinals by Kelsey Rocque. Elsewhere on tour, the team reached the semifinals of both the Red Deer Curling Classic and the International Bernese Ladies Cup. At the Swedish Eliteserien in February, the team defeated Tova Sundberg to claim the event title. They also beat Sundberg in the final of the 2022 Swedish Women's Curling Championship in March. Team Wranå wrapped up their season at the 2022 Players' Championship Grand Slam where they once again qualified for the playoffs. They lost to Tracy Fleury in the quarterfinal round.

Aside from women's curling, de Val also plays mixed doubles with partner Oskar Eriksson. The pair began playing together during the 2020–21 season and immediately found success by winning the 2020 Oberstdorf International Mixed Doubles Cup. In 2021, they won the Swedish mixed doubles national championship, de Val's first gold medal at a national championship. On March 1, 2021, the Swedish Curling Association formally announced the selection of Eriksson and de Val to represent Sweden at the 2021 World Mixed Doubles Curling Championship. At the World Championship, the team posted a perfect 9–0 record through the round robin, being the only team to do so. This qualified them for the semifinals, where they faced Kristin Skaslien and Magnus Nedregotten of Norway. Tied 6–6 in the final end, de Val missed her final draw, giving up a steal of one and the win to the Norwegians. They ended the tournament by defeating Canada's Kerri Einarson and Brad Gushue 7–4 in the bronze medal game.

On June 4, 2021, de Val and Eriksson were selected as the mixed doubles Olympic Team for the 2022 Winter Olympics. In preparation for the Olympics, the pair played in two mixed doubles events, the Aly Jenkins Mixed Doubles Memorial and the Gothenburg Mixed Doubles Cup, reaching the final of the latter. At the Games, de Val and Eriksson qualified for the playoffs with a 5–4 record. They then faced the top-ranked Italian pair of Stefania Constantini and Amos Mosaner in the semifinal, which they lost. They did still earn a medal from the Games, however, as they were able to beat Great Britain's Jennifer Dodds and Bruce Mouat 9–3 in the bronze medal game, a game where de Val shot a perfect 100%. After the game, de Val said that "This was our last chance, our last game, so we had nothing more to lose — just go out there and play the best we can. We both know that it's a lot more fun going home with a medal than without, so that really motivated us to really fight for this game."

Grand Slam record

Teams

References

External links

Swedish female curlers
Living people
1997 births
Sportspeople from Stockholm
Universiade medalists in curling
Universiade gold medalists for Sweden
Universiade bronze medalists for Sweden
Competitors at the 2019 Winter Universiade
Competitors at the 2017 Winter Universiade
Swedish curling champions
People from Sundbyberg Municipality
Curlers at the 2022 Winter Olympics
Olympic curlers of Sweden
Olympic bronze medalists for Sweden
Olympic medalists in curling
Medalists at the 2022 Winter Olympics